Colomba is a town, with a population of 28,655 (2018 census), and a municipality in the Quetzaltenango department of Guatemala with an area of 214 km2 at an altitude of about 1011 metres.

References 

Municipalities of the Quetzaltenango Department

es:Colomba